The battle of Ballynahinch was a military engagement of the Irish Rebellion of 1798 between a force of roughly 4,000 United Irishmen rebels led by Henry Munro and approximately 2,000 government troops under the command of George Nugent. After rebel forces had occupied Newtownards on 9 June, they gathered the next day in the surrounding countryside and elected Munro as their leader, who occupied Ballyhinch on 11 June. Nugent led a column of government troops in 12 June which recaptured the town and bombarded rebel positions. On the next day, the rebels attacked Ballyhinch, but were driven back and defeated.

Background

In County Down, the Irish Rebellion of 1798 by the Society of United Irishmen had faltered after the arrest of William Steel Dickson on 5 June 1798. Several rebel commanders, many of whom were Presbyterian, managed to briefly revive the rebellion's momentum. A rebel force led by David Bailie Warden attacked Newtownards on 9 June, which was garrisoned by a detachment of the York Fencibles. Fencibles stationed in the Market House managed to drive off Warden's rebels but subsequently withdrew, allowing rebel commanders to establish a revolutionary government modelled after the French Committee of Public Safety. On the same day, rebel forces managed to capture Saintfield after defeating its garrison.

In response, British commander George Nugent withdrew most of his forces from military outposts in the eastern region of the county, allowing rebels forces to amass in the centre of the county. Approximately 4,000 rebels from Newtownards, Saintfield and Ballynahinch, equipped with artillery looted from Bangor harbour, gathered in one spot on 10 June and listened to a sermon given by Thomas Ledlie Birch. On the next day, they elected a linen draper from Lisburn, Henry Munro, as the their commander. Munro ordered his forces to occupy Ballynahinch on 11 June before establishing a camp at Montalto, the County Down estate of the Earl of Moira.

Battle 

On the morning of 12 June, Nugent, with a column of roughly 2,000 government soldiers (drawn from the Monaghan Militia, Fifeshire Fencibles and the 22nd Dragoons) and six 6-pounder guns and two howitzers manned by the Royal Artillery, marched onto Saintfield, where it was discovered to have no rebel presence. Nugent's column, which was reinforced by detachments of the Argyll Fencibles and Downpatrick Yeomanry, moved onto Ballynahinch, where his men captured a rebel outpost before occupying the town. As the night began to set in, Nugent's artillery forces began to bombard Montalto and the nearby Ednavady Hill. Numerous rebels, many of them demoralised by the bombardment, slipped away under the cover of darkness.

Some of his subordinates pressed Munro to attack Ballynahinch at night, noting that the "tired and hungry" Monaghan Militia (which formed a major part of Nugent's column) had looted the town and many of them were drunk. However, Munro overruled them, insisting that any rebel attack on Ballynahinch occur at dawn. When dawn came, Munro's rebels attacked the town, driving back the Monaghan Militia in house-to-house combat along with killing the militia's adjutant and capturing several artillery pieces. However, the attacking rebels mistook bugle calls to retreat from government troops as a signal for arriving reinforcements and began to waver. In response, a counter-attack was ordered by Nugent's officers, which led many of the rebels to retreat from Ballynahinch in all directions. Nugent's dragoons and yeomanry pursued the rebels, many of whom were killed or captured; one of the rebels killed was camp follower Betsy Gray. Despite Nugent ordering his cavalry to "be merciful", infuriated dragoons and yeomanry killed several noncombatants in the post-battle reprisals.

Aftermath

Nugent reported that his troops had killed 500 rebels, but local estimates claimed that only 100 rebels had died. On the government side, it was reported that 3 were killed and roughly 30 wounded. The battle was followed by "harsh retribution". Monro was executed by hanging on 16 June after being captured, a fate he shared with many fellow rebel prisoners. Sixty-three houses in Ballynahinch were burnt by Nugent's forces during the battle, most of them on the night of 12 June as his men became drunk and started to loot the town, causing 20,000 pounds of damage. After the battle, residents of Ballynahinch who had fled the town when the rebels occupied it began to return, wearing white headbands and calling themselves the "Supplementary Yeomanry"; these people also looted the damaged town.

According to historian A. T. Q. Stewart,

 Though the principles of the original United Irishmen had inculcated a brotherhood of affection among Irishmen, the effect of 1798 in the North was painfully to emphasise divisions which already existed in religion and society. Catholic soldiers fought with Protestant rebels, and sometimes with Orange yeomanry. Neighbour hunted down neighbour, Church of Ireland was set against Presbyterian, landlord against tenant, engendering feuds among families which have lasted almost to the present. Apart from an assembly of several thousand United Irishmen near Maghera, County Derry, which quickly dispersed, the rebellion was confined to the counties of Antrim and Down, the area east of the Bann. Astonishingly, not one of the other seven Ulster counties took part. Republicanism, which was intended to free the Irish people from sectarianism, became in the nineteenth century part of the dispute.

References

Footnotes

Bibliography

 
 

18th century in County Down
Battles of the Irish Rebellion of 1798
Military history of County Down